English actor Eddie Redmayne has received multiple accolades for his film, television and stage performances. His major nominations include two Academy Awards, three British Academy Film Awards, two Golden Globe Awards, three Laurence Olivier Awards, five Screen Actors Guild Awards, and one Tony Award, with a win each at the Academy Awards, the British Academy Film Awards, the Tony Awards, and the Golden Globes, and two wins each at the Laurence Olivier Awards and the Screen Actors Guild Awards.

In 2010, he won a Laurence Olivier Award and a Tony Award for Best Supporting Actor for his performance in Red, and in 2014, he won the Academy Award, Screen Actors Guild Award, British Academy Film Award, and Golden Globe Award for Best Actor in a Leading Role for his performance as Stephen Hawking in The Theory of Everything.

Major associations

Academy Awards

British Academy Film Awards

Golden Globe Awards

Laurence Olivier Awards

Screen Actors Guild Awards

Tony Awards

Miscellaneous Awards

Annie Awards

Critics' Choice Movie Awards

Drama Desk Awards

Empire Awards

MTV Movie Awards

Satellite Awards

Teen Choice Awards

Other awards and nominations

AACTA Awards

Alliance of Women Film Journalists

Awards Circuit Community Awards

Berlin International Film Festival

Capri, Hollywood International Film Festival

Central Ohio Film Critics Association

Chicago Film Critics Association

Critics' Circle Theatre Awards

Dallas–Fort Worth Film Critics Association

Denver Film Critics Society

Detroit Film Critics Society

Dorian Awards

Drama League Awards

Elle Style Awards

Evening Standard British Film Award

Evening Standard Theatre Awards

Florida Film Critics Circle

Georgia Film Critics Association

Giffoni Film Festival Awards

Golden Raspberry Awards

GQ Men of the Year Awards

Hollywood Film Award

Houston Film Critics Society

Iowa Film Critics

Irish Film and Television Awards

Kansas City Film Critics Circle

London Film Critics' Circle

Montclair Film Festival

National Board of Review

Newport Beach Film Festival

New York Film Critics Online

Online Film & Television Association

Palm Springs International Film Festival

Phoenix Film Critics Circle

Phoenix Film Critics Society

San Diego Film Critics Society

San Francisco Film Critics Circle Awards

Santa Barbara Film Festival

SCAD Savannah Film Festival

Southeastern Film Critics Association

St. Louis Film Critics Gateway Association

Tallinn Black Nights Film Festival

The Hollywood Reporter

Theatre World Award

Turin Film Festival

Vancouver Film Critics Circle Awards

Washington D.C. Area Film Critics Association

WhatsOnStage Awards

Women Film Critics Circle Awards

Zurich Film Festival

Notes

References

External links
 
 

Lists of awards received by British actor